Jefferson de Jesus Santos (born 14 April 1993), known simply as Jefferson, is a Brazilian professional footballer who plays for Iporá Esporte Clube as a defensive midfielder.

Club career

Early years and Portugal
Born in Goiânia, Goiás, Jefferson finished his youth career with Associação Atlética Ponte Preta. He made his senior debut in Portugal, starting out at third division club G.D. Ribeirão.

In the January 2014 transfer window, Jefferson signed with C.D. Santa Clara in the Segunda Liga. He played his first match as a professional on 16 March, starting but being booked and replaced in the 31st minute of an eventual 3–1 away loss against F.C. Penafiel, as he risked being sent off.

Jefferson continued competing at that level in the following seasons, with Leixões S.C. and C.D. Feirense. He annulled his one-year contract with the former side in June 2014, claiming personal reasons.

Hajduk Split
During his spell in Portugal, Jefferson was scouted by the director of football of HNK Hajduk Split, Goran Vučević. He joined the Croatian team in June 2015, but was unable to sign or train with them until his contract with Feirense ran out, making him miss out on training camp in Slovenia and Austria. He made his competitive debut on 12 July, featuring the full 90 minutes in a 1–1 draw at GNK Dinamo Zagreb, gathering praise from the media for his performance and being named Player of the match by Jutarnji list for his role in neutralising opposing player Ante Ćorić.

On 23 July 2015, Jefferson scored from longe-range in a 4–1 home win over FC Koper in the second qualifying round of the UEFA Europa League. He was the most utilised player for the team during the season, and arguably and the best in his position since Josip Radošević, being praised for his tackling skills but also criticised for his passing. On 10 April 2016, in a home game against NK Istra 1961, he was made captain in the last minutes, thus becoming the first Brazilian in Hajduk history to sport the armband.

Chaves
Jefferson returned to Portugal in the 2017 off-season, signing a three-year contract with G.D. Chaves. He finished his first season in the Primeira Liga with 26 appearances, helping to a sixth-place finish.

References

External links
Hajduk official profile 

1993 births
Living people
Sportspeople from Goiânia
Brazilian footballers
Association football midfielders
Campeonato Brasileiro Série D players
Primeira Liga players
Liga Portugal 2 players
Campeonato de Portugal (league) players
G.D. Ribeirão players
C.D. Santa Clara players
Leixões S.C. players
C.D. Feirense players
G.D. Chaves players
U.D. Vilafranquense players
Croatian Football League players
HNK Hajduk Split players
Saudi First Division League players
Al-Jabalain FC players
Brazilian expatriate footballers
Expatriate footballers in Portugal
Expatriate footballers in Croatia
Expatriate footballers in Saudi Arabia
Brazilian expatriate sportspeople in Portugal
Brazilian expatriate sportspeople in Croatia
Brazilian expatriate sportspeople in Saudi Arabia